The Yilan County Council (ILCC) is the elected county council of Yilan County, Taiwan. The council composes of 34 councilors elected in local elections held every four years.

History
After the handover of Taiwan from Japan to the Republic of China in 1945, county assembly was set up according to the Institute of Organization for City and County Councils in 1946. In April 1950, the Taiwan Provincial Government promulgated the Outline for Implementing Local Autonomy for Cities and Counties. The administrative regions were reconfigured in September and the Yilan County Council was founded on 24 February 1951.

Organization

 Speaker
 Deputy Speaker
 Councilors

Agenda Department
 Regular Meeting
 Provisional Meeting
 Procedural Committee
 Disciplinary Committee
 Bill Examination Committee

Administration Department
 Chief Secretary
 Secretary
 Agenda Section
 General Affairs Section
 Statute Office
 Accounting Office
 Personnel Office

Transportation
The council building is accessible south of Yilan Station of Taiwan Railways.

See also
 Yilan County Government

References

External links

 

1951 establishments in Taiwan
County councils of Taiwan
Organizations established in 1951
Yilan County, Taiwan